The Asphodel Meadows is a section of the ancient Greek underworld where ordinary souls are sent to live after death.

Later depictions
The Asphodel Meadows is most probably where the souls of people who lived mediocre lives remain. Its relationship to other places in the Greek afterlife remains uncertain.

For later Greek poets the very ancient pre-Homeric association of the asphodel flower with a positive form of afterlife as well as the enlarged role of Elysium as it became the destination of more than just a few lucky heroes, altered the character of the meadows. Greek poets who wrote after Homer's time describe them as untouched, lovely, soft and holy. Such an evolutionary change is quite common: "Like most cultures throughout human history, both ancient and modern, the Greeks held complex and sometimes contradictory views about the afterlife".

Some depictions describe it as a land of utter neutrality. That is, while the inhabitants were in life neither good nor evil, so they are treated in the afterlife. Other depictions have also stated that all residents drink from the river Lethe before entering the fields, thus losing their identities. This somewhat negative outlook on the afterlife for those who make little impact was perhaps passed down to encourage militarism in Greek cultures (as opposed to inaction). In fact, those who did take up arms and became heroes were rewarded with everlasting joy in the fields of Elysium.

Edith Hamilton suggested in 1999 that the asphodel of these fields are not exactly like the asphodel of our world, but are "presumably strange, pallid, ghostly flowers." Others have suggested, in 2002, that they were actually narcissi.

In popular culture
Asphodel is a level in the 2020 video game Hades. It is depicted as having been flooded by the Phlegethon, changing it from meadows to a scorched hellscape.

There is an area named Asphodelos in the Pandaemonium raid in Final Fantasy XIV: Endwalker, likely referencing the Asphodel Meadows.

References

Works cited
 

Afterlife places
Locations in the Greek underworld